Segyan-Kyuyol (Siegen Küöl) is a rural locality (a selo) and the administrative center of Kirovsky Rural Okrug in Kobyaysky District of the Sakha Republic, Russia. Its population as of the 2010 Census was 395; down from 430 recorded in the 2002 Census.

Geography
The village is located at the southern edge of the Verkhoyansk Range, south of the Munni Range, on the right bank of the Tumara River.

References

Notes

Sources
Official website of the Sakha Republic. Registry of the Administrative-Territorial Divisions of the Sakha Republic. Kobyaysky District. 

Rural localities in Kobyaysky District